Dharaki is a village in Achham District in the Seti Zone of western Nepal.

References

Populated places in Achham District
Village development committees in Achham District